Freeburn is a surname. Notable people with the surname include:

James Freeburn (1808–1876), Scottish engineer, inventor, and industrial designer
Jana Freeburn, Czechoslovak-born American slalom canoeist
William Freeburn (1930–2019), Scottish footballer

See also
Freeburn, Kentucky